Scarborough was the name of a constituency in Yorkshire, electing Members of Parliament to the House of Commons, at two periods. From 1295 until 1918 it was a parliamentary borough consisting only of the town of Scarborough, electing two MPs until 1885 and one from 1885 until 1918. In 1974 the name was revived for a county constituency, covering a much wider area; this constituency was abolished in 1997.

Boundaries
1974–1983: The Borough of Scarborough, the Urban Districts of Pickering and Scalby, and the Rural Districts of Pickering and Scarborough.

1983–1997: The Borough of Scarborough wards of Ayton, Castle, Cayton, Central, Danby, Derwent, Eastfield, Eskdaleside, Falsgrave, Fylingdales, Lindhead, Mayfield, Mulgrave, Newby, Northstead, Scalby, Seamer, Streonshalh, Weaponness, and Woodlands.

History

Scarborough was first represented in a Parliament held at Shrewsbury in 1282, and was one of the boroughs sending 2 MPs to the Model Parliament of 1295 which is now generally considered to be the first parliament in the modern sense.

Until the Great Reform Act of 1832 Scarborough was a corporation borough, the right of election resting solely with the 44-member corporation or "common council". At an earlier period, it seems to have been a matter of some dispute whether the freemen of the borough could also vote, but at an election in 1736 the corporation and the (much more numerous) freemen backed different candidates. The candidate of the freemen was returned to Parliament, but on petition from his defeated opponent the House of Commons decided that only the corporation votes should stand, and overturned the result. In later days the corporation was entirely under the influence of the Duke of Rutland and Earl of Mulgrave, who each nominated one of the Members of Parliament; by 1832, Scarborough had continuously been represented by junior members of their respective families for more than half a century. The restriction on the franchise was challenged in 1791, and Parliament declared in favour of "the ancient right of inhabitant householders" in the borough to vote, but the decision seems to have been a dead-letter for at the election of 1802, the last to be contested before the Reform Act, only 33 voters cast their votes.

At the time of the Reform Act, the borough had a population of about 8,760 in just over 2,000 houses, and the Act left its boundaries and two members intact, though widening the franchise. (There were 431 electors registered at the 1832 election.) The constituency remained broadly unchanged until 1918, though from 1885 its representation was reduced from two MPs to one.

After abolition in 1918, the constituency was absorbed into the new Scarborough and Whitby county constituency. However, the boundary changes which came into effect at the February 1974 general election created a new constituency named Scarborough. This was a county constituency including, in addition to Scarborough itself and its suburb Scalby, the town of Pickering and the Scarborough and Pickering rural districts.

There were further boundary changes at the 1983 general election, which brought in Whitby and its surrounding area in place of the Pickering district. The constituency was abolished once more for the 1997 general election, when it was again largely replaced by a new Scarborough and Whitby constituency.

Members of Parliament

Constituency created (1295)

MPs 1295–1540

MPs 1542–1640

MPs 1640–1885

Representation reduced to one member (1885)

MPs 1885–1918

MPs 1974–1997

Elections 1640–1885

Elections in the 1830s

Elections in the 1840s

Elections in the 1850s
Phipps was appointed Comptroller of the Household, requiring a by-election.

  

 
  

Phipps was appointed Treasurer of the Household, requiring a by-election.

 

 
  

Phipps resigned after being appointed Lieutenant Governor of Nova Scotia, causing a by-election.

Elections in the 1860s
Denison succeeded to the peerage, becoming Lord Londesborough and causing a by-election.

  

  

 

Vanden-Bempde-Johnstone's death caused a by-election.

Elections in the 1870s

Elections in the 1880s 

 

Jonhstone's resignation caused a by-election.

Dodson was elevated to the peerage, becoming Lord Monk Bretton, causing a by-election.

Caine was appointed Civil Lord of the Admiralty, requiring a by-election.

Elections 1885–1918

Elections in the 1880s

Elections in the 1890s

Elections in the 1900s

Elections in the 1910s 

General election 1914–15:

Another general election was required to take place before the end of 1915. The political parties had been making preparations for an election to take place and by the July 1914, the following candidates had been selected; 
Liberal: Walter Rea
Unionist:

Elections 1970–1997

Elections in the 1970s

Elections in the 1980s

Election in the 1990s

See also
List of parliamentary constituencies in North Yorkshire

Notes and references

Sources
 D. Brunton & D. H. Pennington, Members of the Long Parliament (London: George Allen & Unwin, 1954)
 Cobbett's Parliamentary history of England, from the Norman Conquest in 1066 to the year 1803 (London: Thomas Hansard, 1808) 
 F. W. S. Craig, British Parliamentary Election Results 1832–1885 (2nd edition, Aldershot: Parliamentary Research Services, 1989)
 Thomas Hinderwell, The history and antiquities of Scarborough and the vicinity (2nd edition, York: Thomas Wilson & Son, 1811) 
 J. Holladay Philbin, Parliamentary Representation 1832 – England and Wales (New Haven: Yale University Press, 1965)
 Edward Porritt and Annie G. Porritt, The Unreformed House of Commons (Cambridge University Press, 1903)
 Henry Stooks Smith, The Parliaments of England from 1715 to 1847 (2nd edition, edited by F. W. S. Craig – Chichester: Parliamentary Reference Publications, 1973)
 Robert Walcott, English Politics in the Early Eighteenth Century (Oxford: Oxford University Press, 1956)

Parliamentary constituencies in Yorkshire and the Humber (historic)
Constituencies of the Parliament of the United Kingdom established in 1295
Constituencies of the Parliament of the United Kingdom disestablished in 1918
Constituencies of the Parliament of the United Kingdom established in 1974
Constituencies of the Parliament of the United Kingdom disestablished in 1997
Politics of the Borough of Scarborough